Mattera is a surname. Notable people with the surname include:

Adam Mattera, British magazine editor
Don Mattera (1935–2022), South African poet and writer
Jason Mattera (born 1983), American writer, activist and magazine editor
Tom Mattera (born 1979), American film director, producer and screenwriter